Kidder & Ko is a lost 1918 silent film comedy directed by Richard Foster Baker and starring Bryant Washburn and Gertrude Selby.

Cast
Bryant Washburn - Cuthbert Kidder
Harry Dunkinson - Silas Kidder
Gertrude Selby - Julie Knight
Wadsworth Harris - James Knight
Carl Stockdale

References

External links

lobby poster; possibly for a re-issue

1918 films
American silent feature films
Lost American films
1918 comedy films
Silent American comedy films
American black-and-white films
1918 lost films
Lost comedy films
1910s American films